Patria Rastra Dinawan (born 26 November 1989) is an Indonesian former professional cyclist.

Major results

2008
 3rd Road race, National Road Championships
2010
 Tour de Indonesia
1st Stages 1 (TTT) & 7
 5th Tour de Jakarta
2012
 3rd Tour de Jakarta
2014
 Tour de Ijen
1st Points classification
1st Stage 2
 1st Stage 3 Tour de Filipinas

References

External links

 

1989 births
Living people
Indonesian male cyclists
21st-century Indonesian people